

Current broadcasters
Radio: Flagship WTMJ 620 plus other stations in the Midwest on the Brewers Radio Network.
Television (English): Bally Sports Wisconsin
Television (Spanish): A schedule of mainly Sunday home games is carried by Milwaukee's Telemundo network affiliate, WYTU-LD (channels 63/49.4).

Radio
Bob Uecker, Play by Play (since 1971)
Jeff Levering, Play by Play (since 2015)
Lane Grindle, fill-in play-by-play when Uecker or Levering is off (since 2016)

Television
Brian Anderson, Substitute Play by Play (since 2022), Play by Play (2007-2021)
Bill Schroeder, Color Analyst (since 1995)
Craig Coshun, Brewers Live Host (since 2007), Reporter (since 2001), Substitute Play by Play (since 2010)
 Matt LePay (broadcaster/ play by play (2014-2021)
Jerry Augustine, Brewers Live Color Analysis (since 2009)
Telly Hughes, Reporter (since 2009)
Sophia Minnaert, Sideline reporter and producer
Jeff Levering, Play By Play (since 2022), Substitute Play by Play (2015-2021)

Radio broadcasters
Lane Grindle (2016–present)
Jeff Levering (2015–present)
Craig Counsell (2014) (fill-in)
Darryl Hamilton (2014) (fill-in) (deceased)
Jerry Augustine (2014) (fill-in)
Joe Block (2012–2015)
Dave Nelson (2010) (interim basis, while Uecker was on medical leave) (deceased)
Cory Provus (2009–2011)
Jim Powell (1996–2008)
Pat Hughes (1984–1995)
Dwayne Mosley (1982–1983)
Lorn Brown (1980–1981)
Bob Uecker (1971–present)
Tom Collins (1970–1972)
Merle Harmon (1970–1979)
Bill Schonely (1969)
Jimmy Dudley (1969) (deceased)

Radio broadcasters chronology
Bold denotes current broadcasters as of the 2016 Brewers season
† - Denotes season where franchise was based in Seattle as the Pilots, which aired game broadcasts on KVI

Radio broadcasters
Merle Harmon (1970–79) (deceased)
Tom Collins (1970-1972) (deceased)
Bob Uecker (1971–present) (since 2014, about 120 games per season)
Lorn Brown (1980–81) (deceased)
Dwayne Mosely (1982–83)
Pat Hughes (1984–95)
Jim Powell (1996-2008)
Len Kasper (1999-2001) (fill-in only)
Cory Provus (2009-2011)
Dave Nelson (2010) (filled in when Uecker was out because heart surgery) (deceased)
Joe Block (2012–15)
Darryl Hamilton (2014) (fill-in for Uecker) (deceased)
Craig Counsell (2014) (fill-in for Uecker)
Jerry Augustine (2014) (fill-in for Uecker)
Jeff Levering (2015–present) (fill-in for about 40 games (2015), full-time (2016–2021), fill-in for Uecker about 50 games 2022–present)
Lane Grindle (2016–present) (fill-in for Uecker in about 40 games (2015-2021), full-time 2022–present)

TV broadcasters
Jeff Levering (2022–present) 
Matt Lepay (2014–2021) (fill-in work only)
Brian Anderson (2007–present) 
Daron Sutton (2002–2006)
Craig Coshun (2001–present)
Len Kasper (1999–2001) (fill-in only)
Jim Powell (1999–2000) (fill-in work only)
Matt Vasgersian (1997–2001)
Bill Schroeder (1995–present)
Rory Markas (1992–1994) (deceased)
Del Crandall (1992–1994) (deceased)
Pete Vuckovich (1989–1991)
Jim Paschke (1987–1991, 1995–1996)
Steve Shannon (1981–1986) (deceased)
Kent Derdivanis (1981)
Joe Castiglione (1981)
Mike Hegan (1978–1980, 1982–1988) (deceased)
Ray Scott (1976–1977) (deceased)
Gary Bender (1975)
Eddie Doucette (1973–1974)
Johnny Logan (1973) (deceased)
Bob Uecker (1972, 1976–1980, 1984)
Jim Irwin (1971, 1975) (deceased)
Tom Collins (1970–1974, 1981) (deceased)
Merle Harmon (1970–1972, 1976–1979) (deceased)
Dan O'Neill (1970)

TV broadcasters chronology

Milwaukee Brewers
Broadcasters
Fox Sports Networks
Bally Sports